Frederick Cleveland Hibbard  (June 15, 1881 – December 12, 1950) was an American sculptor based in Chicago. Hibbard is best remembered for his Civil War memorials, produced to commemorate both the Union and Confederate causes.

Born and raised in Canton, Missouri, he graduated from the University of Missouri before deciding to be a sculptor. He studied with Lorado Taft at the School of the Art Institute of Chicago.

Hibbard was a member of the National Sculpture Society and exhibited at their 1923 show held in New York City.

Selected works
Carter H. Harrison, Union Park, Chicago, Illinois, 1907.
 Samuel Langhorne Clemens (Mark Twain), Riverview Park, Hannibal, Missouri, 1913.
 Volney Rogers Memorial, Mill Creek Park, Youngstown, Ohio, 1920
Bust of John Ross Callahan, Ohio State University College of Dentistry, Columbus, Ohio, 1923.
 Relief portrait of Jefferson Davis, bronze, Jefferson Davis Monument State Historic Site, Fairview, Kentucky, 1924.
Tom Sawyer and Huck Finn at the Foot of Cardiff Hill, Cardiff Hill, North & Main Streets, Hannibal, Missouri, 1926.
 Jefferson Davis, marble, Kentucky State Capitol, Frankfort, Kentucky, 1936.
 Jefferson Davis, bronze, Alabama State Capitol, Montgomery, Alabama,  1940.
Abraham and Mary Todd Lincoln Monument, East Park, Racine, Wisconsin, 1943.

Military monuments and memorials
Statue of bald eagle on Illinois Memorial, Vicksburg National Military Park, 1906.
Confederate Soldier Monument, Monroe County Courthouse, Forsyth, Georgia, 1907–08.
 General James Shields, Carroll County Courthouse, Carrollton, Missouri,  1910.
A replica is at the Minnesota State Capitol in Saint Paul.
 Artillery, Cavalry, Infantry, Navy, Sedgwick County Soldiers and Sailors Monument, Wichita, Kansas, 1913. E. M. Viquesney designed the monument and modeled the Victory figure atop its dome.
 Confederate Memorial, erected by the United Daughters of the Confederacy, Shiloh National Military Park, 1917
 Col. Alexander Doniphan, Ray County Courthouse, Richmond, Missouri, 1917–18.
 Equestrian Statue of General Ulysses S. Grant, Vicksburg National Military Park, Vicksburg, Mississippi,  1919.
 Col. David N. Foster, Swinney Park, Ft. Wayne, Indiana, 1922.
 Parade Rest and Lookout, Soldiers and Sailors National Military Museum and Memorial, Pittsburgh, Pennsylvania. 1923.
James Pendergast Memorial, Case Park, Kansas City, MO. 1913.
 Fawn fountain, at Promontory Point (Chicago)

References

External links
 
 SIRIS 

1881 births
1950 deaths
20th-century American sculptors
20th-century American male artists
American male sculptors
People from Canton, Missouri